Çatakgeriş is a village in the Türkeli district of Sinop Province, Turkey.

Geography 
It is 130 km from Sinop and 30 km from Türkeli.

Population

References 

Villages in Sinop Province
Türkeli District